Sainte-Marie-Geest is a village of Wallonia in the municipality of Jodoigne, district of Saint-Jean-Geest, located in the province of Walloon Brabant, Belgium.

External links